Geneva Sayre (June 12, 1911, Guthrie Center, Iowa – May 26, 1992, Northhampton, Massachusetts) was an American bryologist and bibliographer. She "pioneered bibliographical and historical bryology, a new field in the study, evaluation, and organization of the literature of bryology."

Biography
Sayre graduated in 1933 with a bachelor's degree from Grinnell College, where she was taught botany by Henry Conard. She graduated in 1935 with an M.A. from the University of Wyoming and in 1938 with an Ph.D. at the University of Colorado, where she worked as an instructor until 1940.

At Russell Sage College, Sayre was a faculty member from 1940 to 1972, when she retired as professor emerita. In 1972 she became a research associate at Harvard University's Farlow Library and Herbarium of Cryptogamic Botany. There she trained curatorial assistants in the conservation and systematization of cryptogamic collections and scientifically inventoried 19th-century bryological collections. In 1981 a volume in honor of her 70th birthday was published by the Farlow Herbarium of Cryptogamic Botany. In 1981 her friends and colleagues established the Geneva Sayre Fund to support visiting scholars studying at the Farlow Herbarium.

As a bryologist, Sayre was a leading expert on the moss genus Grimmia. In order to clarify the taxonomic nomenclature of the mosses, in 1959 she privately published Dates of Publications Describing Musci, 1801-1821.

She was the president of American Bryological and Lichenological Society from 1951 to 1953. In 1983 the International Association of Bryologists awarded the Hedwig Medal to Sayre (and to Yoshinori Asakawa) for lifetime achievement in bryology.

At the end of WW II she organized the sending of food, clothes, money, books, and scientific equipment to distressed bryologists in Germany and other European countries.

Selected publications

References

1911 births
1992 deaths
20th-century American botanists
Bryologists
American women botanists
People from Guthrie Center, Iowa
Grinnell College alumni
University of Wyoming alumni
University of Colorado alumni
Russell Sage College faculty
American women academics
20th-century American women scientists
Women bryologists